Samsonki  is a settlement in the administrative district of Gmina Zbąszynek, within Świebodzin County, Lubusz Voivodeship, in western Poland.

References

Samsonki